Martin Maroši (born 23 March 1988 in Bratislava) is a Slovak footballer who currently plays for FK Fotbal Třinec in the Czech Republic as a midfielder.

He emerged from Inter Bratislava's youth set up and was signed up by Artmedia Petržalka as a promising young talent. He made his debut as a late substitute in a 
UEFA Cup away tie against Dinamo Minsk. After a difficult time trying to break into the first team he moved to Czech 2nd division side Fotbal Třinec in search of first team opportunities.

In 2010, he completed a loan switch to Czech 1st division outfit Zbrojovka Brno but failed to make an appearance for the first team.

Personal life
He is also the nephew of former Zbrojovka Brno and Sigma Olomouc player and icon Jan Maroši.

References

External links

1988 births
Living people
Slovak footballers
Slovak Super Liga players
FC Petržalka players
Association football midfielders
Footballers from Bratislava